The following are lists of Ben 10 episodes:

 List of Ben 10 (2005 TV series) episodes
 List of Ben 10: Alien Force episodes
 List of Ben 10: Ultimate Alien episodes
 List of Ben 10: Omniverse episodes
 List of Ben 10 (2016 TV series) episodes